The Municipality of Ermington and Rydalmere was a local government area in the Western region of Sydney, New South Wales, Australia. Initially proclaimed as the southern part of the Borough of Dundas in 1889, following a petition of secession the municipality was proclaimed as the Municipal District of Ermington and Rydalmere on 18 June 1891. It included the modern suburbs of Rydalmere and parts of Dundas, Ermington and Melrose Park. From 1 January 1949, the council was amalgamated into the City of Parramatta, with the passing of the Local Government (Areas) Act 1948.

Council history

Early years and development
The area consisting of the future Ermington-Rydalmere municipality was first incorporated on 23 March 1889, when the "Borough of Dundas" was proclaimed in the lands east of the Town of Parramatta. However this state of affairs was short-lived, when 94 residents submitted a petition to the NSW Government on 13 February 1891 requesting the creation of a separate municipality divided into two wards. This petition was subsequently accepted and the Governor of New South Wales, The Earl of Jersey, proclaimed the establishment of the "Municipal District of Ermington and Rydalmere" on 18 June 1891. On the separation, The Cumberland Argus and Fruitgrowers' Advocate, which had opposed the separation, noted: "There will be a good deal of weeping and wailing at Dundas in consequence; but, although we fought tooth and nail against the petitioners, we hope now to see the hatchet buried. Both municipalities must work together for their own good".

The first council, comprising six Aldermen in two wards, was first elected on 22 August 1891, with two auditors, Frederick Creswick and Samuel Dean Jack, elected on 15 August. The council first met on 24 August 1891, with Returning Officer, Walter Monckton, appointed acting town clerk.

 Thomas Williamson, who had led the separation petitioners, was elected the first mayor on 22 September 1891, and Ernest William Price was appointed first Town Clerk. 
A subsequent petition to re-amalgamate Ermington-Rydalmere with Dundas in 1898 was rejected by the council. From 28 December 1906, following the passing of the Local Government Act, 1906, the council was renamed as the "Municipality of Ermington and Rydalmere".

Council seat
The first public meetings and council meeting took place in the Rydalmere School of Arts on Victoria Road, Rydalmere. The Rydalmere School of Arts was designed by W. H. Monckton and officially opened by the Minister for Public Instruction, Joseph Carruthers, on 13 December 1890. The council continued to meet there and completed their purchase of the hall by March 1898, becoming known as the "Rydalmere Town Hall". Council subsequently commissioned various renovations and facade alterations to follow this acquisition.

In July 1946, the Town Hall was set on fire during an attempted robbery, resulting in the loss of many of the council's records, but it was quickly renovated and re-opened in November 1946. The Town Hall remained in council ownership following amalgamation in 1949 and survived into the 1960s but was later demolished to make way for a public park.

Later history
By the end of the Second World War, the NSW Government had realised that its ideas of infrastructure expansion could not be effected by the present system of the patchwork of small municipal councils across Sydney and the Minister for Local Government, Joseph Cahill, initiated the 1945–46 Clancy Royal Commission on Local Government Boundaries, to consider these changes. Ermington-Rydalmere and Dundas municipalities recognised this pressure by initiated procedures to amalgamate once more and Ermington-Rydalmere appointed A. T. Kay, Town Clerk of Dundas, as their acting town clerk in anticipation of this.

The NSW Government however passed a bill following the recommendations of the Royal Commission in 1948 that abolished a significant number of Sydney metropolitan councils. Pre-empted the actions of Dundas and Ermington-Rydalmere, under the Local Government (Areas) Act 1948 (effective 1 January 1949), both councils merged with the City of Parramatta to form the a new City of Parramatta.

The Ermington-Rydalmere municipality became "Ermington-Rydalmere Ward", returning two aldermen. In 1950 a reorganisation of Parramatta's wards resulted in the ward being absorbed into the Dundas Ward.

Mayors

Town Clerks

References

Ermington and Rydalmere
Ermington and Rydalmere
Ermington and Rydalmere
Ermington and Rydalmere